Capital Airlines may refer to:

 Beijing Capital Airlines, an airline based in China formerly named Deer Air
 Capital Airlines (United States), a now-defunct 20th-century American airline
 Capital Airlines (Nigeria), a now-defunct airline based in Nigeria
 Capital Airlines (UK), a now-defunct airline based in the United Kingdom
 Capital Cargo International Airlines, an American cargo airline

Capitol
 Capitol International Airways, a now-defunct American airline
 Capitol Air Express, an international charter airline which belonged to John Catsimatidis